This is a list of khans of the Crimean Khanate, a state which existed in present-day southern Ukraine from 1441 until 1783. Crimean Tatars, although not a part of the Ukrainian ethnos, are deeply interconnected, having ruled a large part of modern Ukraine over the span of 300 years.

The position of Khan in Crimea was electoral and was picked by beys from four of the most noble families (also known as Qarachi beys: Argyns, Kipchaks, Shirins, and Baryns) at kurultai where the decision about a candidate was adopted. The newly elected Khan was raised on a white felt sheet and over him were read Islamic prayers, after that the Khan was triumphantly enthroned.

List
The following is the chronological table of reigns of Khans of the Crimean Khanate from the Giray dynasty:

See also

List of Ukrainian rulers

References

External links
Hansaray.org.ua

Crimean Khanate
Mongol rulers
Politics of the Ottoman Empire
khans
Crimean
Turkic rulers